Dréan is a district in El Taref Province, Algeria. It was named after its capital, Dréan.  French author and philosopher Albert Camus was born there.

Municipalities
The district is further divided into 3 municipalities:
Dréan
Chihani
Chebaita Mokhtar

Districts of El Taref Province